The 1963–64 Gonzaga Bulldogs men's basketball team represented Gonzaga University during the 1963–64 NCAA University Division basketball season. In the inaugural season of the Big Sky Conference, the Bulldogs were led by thirteenth-year head coach Hank Anderson and played their home games off campus at the Spokane Coliseum in Spokane, Washington.

References

External links
Sports Reference – Gonzaga Bulldogs: 1963–64 basketball season

Gonzaga Bulldogs men's basketball seasons
Gonzaga